Fact 2002 was a 12-inch record released by the pop group Bis, paying tribute to Factory Records. The EP was given a low-key release.

It features covers of Joy Division's biggest hit "Love Will Tear Us Apart" (1980), New Order's B-side "Hurt" which was released with "Temptation" (1982), the debut single of A Certain Ratio "Shack Up" (1980) and "Looking from a Hilltop" from Section 25, which originally appeared on ''From the Hip (1984).

Track listing

References

2001 EPs
Bis (Scottish band) EPs